GroundBIRD is an experiment to observe the cosmic microwave background at 145 and 220GHz. It aims to observe the B-mode polarisation signal from inflation in the early universe. It is located at Teide Observatory, on the island of Tenerife in the Canary Islands.

Scientific goals 
The telescope was constructed to measure the B-mode signal in the polarisation of the Cosmic Microwave Background (CMB), in order to look for evidence of cosmic inflation in the early universe. The name 'GroundBIRD' indicates that the telescope is ground-based, while BIRD stands for B-mode Imaging Radiation Detector. It is related to the future, similarly-named, LiteBIRD CMB satellite.

Telescope 

The telescope is inside the cryostat, which is mounted on a rotation table, with a rotary joint that provides helium gas and electricity to the cryostat. The mirrors are cooled to  using a Pulse tube refrigerator to reduce the thermal noise from the mirror surfaces.

The experiment uses microwave kinetic inductance detectors (MKIDs), which are cooled to 250mK by a sorption cooler within the cryostat, which uses helium-3, and was manufactured by Chase Research Cryogenics Ltd. The signals from the detector are multiplexed, and around 100 detectors can be measured in both phase and amplitude with a single digital read-out system with a bandwidth of 200MHz, recording 1,000 samples per second. The digital system uses 12-bit ADCs and a Kintex-7 FPGA from Xilinx initially, and now uses Kintex ultrascale FPGAs. Raspberry Pis are used to monitor and control the telescope.

The cryostat rotates at 20 rpm (120° per second, 1 rotation every 3 seconds) to minimize 1/f noise. It observes at zenith angles up to 20°, mapping around 40% of the sky. The field of view is 10°, with an angular resolution of 0.5° FWHM at 145GHz, and 0.3° at 220GHz. It will measure the CMB at 

The telescope was constructed at KEK in Japan. Test observations started in Japan in 2014. It was shipped to Tenerife in January 2019. In February 2020, the experiment was visited by Kenji Hiramatsu, the Japanese Ambassador to Spain.

Collaboration 

The collaboration includes scientists from:
 Delft University of Technology, Netherlands
 The Graduate University for Advanced Studies, Japan
 Korea Astronomy and Space Science Institute, Korea
 Instituto de Astrofísica de Canarias, Canary Islands, Spain
 KEK, Japan
 Korea University, Korea
 Kyoto University, Japan
 National Astronomical Observatory of Japan, Japan
 RIKEN, Japan
 Saitama University, Japan
 Tohoku University, Japan
 University of Tokyo, Japan

Funding 

The project is funded by:
 Ministry of Education, Culture, Sports, Science and Technology, Japan
 The Graduate University for Advanced Studies, Japan
 National Astronomical Observatory of Japan, Japan
 National Research Foundation of Korea, Korea
with additional support from:
 OpenIt, Japan

References 

Cosmic microwave background experiments